University of York Students' Union (YUSU) is the representative body for the students at the University of York, England. It provides representation for all students, is the key provider of entertainment and welfare services, and operates a range of commercial ventures including a cafe bar and events & marketing department. Pierrick Roger is the current Union President. At one time entertainer Tom Scott was president after running as Mad Cap'n Tom, entered against his will by friends and dressed as a pirate.

YUSU is responsible for representing and campaigning for students to the university, for example over improved facilities such as a 24-hour library.

Services

Events 
Most regular late night events are run by College Junior Common Room Committees in the campus bars; however the union provides support to individual college Entertainments reps, through providing training, health and safety advice, and acts as a representative to university Catering and Bar Management, as well as to other venues in York city. The Union runs Late Licence events in The Courtyard on a Saturday night; and organises a variety of cross Campus events including the Freshers and Graduation Balls.

Welfare 
The Union provides an individual casework service, as well as running campaigns on specific issues such as sexual health or academic integrity.

Student Action and RAG 
The Union runs various "Student Action" projects which aim to provide student development, while giving something back to the local community. One of the major project it runs is an annual 'Kids Camp' which is a residential holiday for Underprivileged children, staffed by volunteers.

York Sport Union
The Union funds and supports a number of sports clubs, which compete with other universities in leagues such as BUCS. It also organizes the annual Roses Tournament which takes place against Lancaster University.

Sabbatical officers
The Union's current sabbatical officer team consists of:

While resignations are rare, in early 2021, the then Activities Officer, Brian Terry, resigned from his post, citing coronavirus and an offer of long term employment.

References

External links
 

Students' Union
Student Union
York